Xestochilus is a genus of eel in the family Ophichthidae. The genus contains one species being Xestochilus nebulosus (nebulosus snake eel). X. Nebulosus lives in the indo-pacific ocean in 2 to 42 meter deep waters. The nebulosus snake eel are found in tidepools, weed bottoms and sand inside tropical waters .The species max length is 47 centimeters.

References

Ophichthidae
Fish described in 1962